Malek Chergui (born 2 July 1988) is a French professional footballer who plays as a forward.

Professional career
Formed in Dijon FCO, had two stints with Grenoble from 2011–12 and again after 2017 where he helped promoted them into the Ligue 2.

Personal life
Chergui was born in Échirolles, France and is of Algerian descent.

References

External links
 
 
 Foot National Profile
 
 GF38 Profile

Living people
1988 births
Sportspeople from Grenoble
Footballers from Auvergne-Rhône-Alpes
Association football forwards
French footballers
French sportspeople of Algerian descent
Grenoble Foot 38 players
AS Cannes players
Dijon FCO players
Valenciennes FC players
Ligue 2 players
Championnat National players
Championnat National 2 players